Philippe Goy  (born 1941) is a French science fiction writer.  He is a photographer under his real name, but he writes under the pseudo-pen name Philip Goy. An alumnus of l'École normale supérieure, he is now a physics researcher at the CNRS.

Fiction 
 Le père éternel 	 Paris : Denoël  (1974) OCLC 1860252 
 Faire le mur, (with Stéphane Dumont) Denoël (1980)  
 Le livre/machine (Special mention at the festival de Metz in 1976) 
 Vers la révolution 
 Retour à la Terre, définitif (prize for best new writer at the Limoges convention in 1977)

References

French science fiction writers
1941 births
Living people
French male novelists